This is a list of vehicles and aircraft used by the United States Marine Corps, for combat, support, and motor transport.

Vehicles 
The below list contains vehicles confirmed to be in service as of early 2022. This list may not include stored or limited use equipment.

Aircraft

F/A-18 Hornet 

F/A-18A/C/CN fighter/attack
Inventory: 168
F/A-18B/D fighter/attack

Inventory: 72

F-35 Lightning II 
F-35B STOVL fighter/attack

Inventory: 353

F-35C carrier variant fighter/attack

Inventory: 67

AV-8 Harrier 

AV-8B Harrier II fighter/attack
Inventory: 101
TAV-8 Harrier trainer
Inventory: 16

KC-130 Hercules/Super Hercules 

KC-130J Super Hercules refueler/transport
Inventory: 57

KC-130T (Reserve) Hercules refueler/transport
Inventory: 7

AH-1 Cobra 
Inventory: 96
AH-1Z Viper helicopter gunship

UH-1 Iroquois 
UH-1Y Venom
Inventory: 140

CH-53E Super Stallion 

CH-53E Super Stallion upgraded cargo/passenger helicopter
Inventory: 141

MV-22 Osprey 

MV-22B Osprey cargo/passenger tiltrotor
Inventory (Planned total): 348

Unmanned aerial vehicles 

Wasp reconnaissance
AeroVironment Switchblade attack
RQ-11 Raven reconnaissance
RQ-14 Dragon Eye reconnaissance
RQ-20 Puma reconnaissance
T-20 reconnaissance
ScanEagle reconnaissance
RQ-21A Blackjack reconnaissance
InstantEye reconnaissance

Testing/Limited Use

Prototypes/Testing/Experimental
LAV-MEWSS (Mobile Electronic Warfare Support System) electronic warfare
LAV-EFSS (Expeditionary Fire Support System) replacement for LAV-M
Amphibious Combat Vehicle (ACV) replacement for AAV
F-35B Lightning II replacement for AV-8B and F/A-18
H-1 upgrade program:
AH-1Z Viper replacement for AH-1W SuperCobra
Sikorsky CH-53K
Unmanned K-MAX

HMMWV replacement

Accepted for short term partial replacements until development of the Joint Light Tactical Vehicle is complete
(see also: Medium Mine Protected Vehicle)

MRAP-MRUV (Mine Resistant Ambush Protected - Mine Resistant Utility Vehicle)
BAE Caiman
BAE OMC RG-31 Nyala
BAE RG-33 4×4
Force Protection Cougar H 4×4
International MaxxPro
MRAP-JERRV (Mine Resistant Ambush Protected - Joint Explosive Ordnance Disposal Rapid Response Vehicle)
Force Protection Cougar HE 6×6
BAE RG-33L 6×6
GDLS RG-31E
International MaxxPro XL
BAE Caiman
Force Protection Buffalo
MRAP M-ATV (Mine Resistant Ambush Protected-All Terrain Vehicle)
Oshkosh M-ATV

Uncommon/Unique

Commercial Utility Cargo Vehicle M88x, M89x, and M1010 series
M1030M1 Motorcycle
various GME vehicles, to include the John Deere Gator
C-9B Skytrain II VIP passenger
C-12 Huron VIP passenger
UC-35D VIP passenger
C-20G Gulfstream VIP passenger
F-5E/F Tiger II opposing force trainers
HH-1N SAR helicopter
Marine One
VH-3D Sea King
VH-60N White hawk
C-130T "Fat Albert" used with the Blue Angels

Retired

Wheeled Vehicles

Humvee Base fleet (1984–1993):
M998/M1097 troop/cargo/MRC radio truck
AN/MRC-XXX (110/135/138/140/142/145/148) Radio vehicles
AN/USQ-70 PADS (Position Azimuth Determining System) survey vehicle
M1097 heavy cargo truck
M1097 Avenger anti-aircraft platform
M1097 maintenance contact truck (C7033 equipment)
M1037/M1042 S250 electronic shelter carrier
M1043/M1044 armament carrier
M1045/M1046 TOW missile carrier
M1035 2-litter ambulance
M997 4-litter ambulance

M3 Scout Car (limited use)
Jeep  BRC-40 MA/MB GP/GPW
M38 truck
M151 1/4 ton truck
M606 truck
M422 Mighty Mite
M715 Kaiser
Desert Patrol Vehicle "dune buggy"
M35 series 2½ ton cargo truck "deuce and a half" 
DUKW
M54 truck
5-ton truck series:
cargo: M813, M814, M923, M924, M925, M926, M928, M927, M939
bolster: M815
dump: M817, M929, M930
tractor: M818, M931, M932
wrecker: M816, M936
tractor/wrecker w/ 5th wheel: M819, M933
van: M820, M934, M935
bridging: M821

Tracked Vehicles

M2 Half Track Car
M3 Half-track
M50 Ontos self-propelled recoilless rifle
M110/M107 self-propelled howitzer
M2 Light Tank
M3 Stuart flamethrower tank
M4 Sherman tank
M48 Patton tank
M60 Patton tank
M103 heavy tank
M1 Abrams tank - 403 tanks put in storage 
LVT-1/2/3/4 Landing Vehicle, Tracked
LVT-5 Amphibious Tractor

Artillery

M108 Self Propelled Howitzer
M109 Self Propelled Howitzer
M110 Self Propelled Howitzer
M91 Multiple Rocket Launcher
MIM-23 Hawk Medium-Range Surface-to-air Missile System

Aircraft

Vought VE-7 Fighter biplane
O2U Corsair Scout biplane
SOC Seagull Observation biplane
FF-1 Fighter biplane
F2F Fighter biplane
F3F Fighter biplane
F2A Buffalo Fighter
F4F Wildcat Fighter
F4U Corsair Fighter
SBD Dauntless Dive bomber
SB2C Helldiver Dive bomber
TBF Avenger Torpedo bomber
PBJ-1 Mitchell Bomber
JM-1 Marauder Towing aircraft
PV-1 Ventura Night fighter
PB4Y-1 Liberator Reconnaissance
PB4Y-2 Privateer Reconnaissance
F6F Hellcat Fighter
F8F Bearcat Fighter
A-1 Skyraider Attack/bomber
A/D-5Q Skyraider Electronic warfare
FJ Fury Jet Fighter
F9F Panther Fighter
FH-1 Phantom Fighter
F2H Banshee Fighter
F-9 Cougar Fighter
F-10 Skyknight Fighter
EF-10 Skyknight Electronic warfare
A-4 Skyhawk Attack
F6 Skyray Fighter
F-8 Crusader Fighter
RF-8A Crusader Reconnaissance
F-4 Phantom II Fighter/attack/bomber
RF-4B Phantom Reconnaissance
A-6 Intruder Attack
EA-6A Electric Intruder Electronic warfare (precursor to EA-6 Prowler)
OV-10 Bronco Observation aircraft
R4D Skytrain Cargo plane
R5D Skymaster Cargo plane
R5C Commando Cargo plane
R4Q Flying Boxcar Cargo plane
HRS-1 Chickasaw Cargo helicopter
CH-43 Choctaw Cargo helicopter
CH-3 Sea King Cargo helicopter
UH-1N Twin Huey Utility helicopter
UH-1D/H Iroqouis "Huey" Utility helicopter
AH-1 Cobra "HueyCobra" Attack helicopter
VH-71 Kestrel replacement for Marine One VH-3D Sea King and VH-60N Nighthawk was cancelled in 2009
Mastiv RPV system UAV
RQ-2 Pioneer UAV reconnaissance
Barrage balloon
Glider
CH-46 Sea Knight Cargo/passenger helicopter
CH-53D Sea Stallion Cargo/passenger helicopter
KC-130F/R Hercules tactical aerial refueler/assault transport
RQ-7 Shadow reconnaissance

See also

List of military aircraft of the United States
List of land vehicles of the U.S. armed forces
List of U.S. military vehicles by model number
United States Marine Corps Aviation
Boomerang (mobile shooter detection system)

References

 TM 11240-OD PRINCIPAL TECHNICAL CHARACTERISTICS OF U.S. MARINE CORPS MOTOR TRANSPORT EQUIPMENT 

Vehicles

Marines
U.S. marines
U.S. marines